Domagoj Pavičić (born 9 March 1994) is a Croatian professional footballer who plays as a midfielder for Konyaspor in the Turkish Süper Lig.

Club career
Pavičić joined Lokomotiva on two loans from Dinamo Zagreb in order to get first team chances. He scored his first goal for the club against Zadar in a 2-0 away win. After returning from loan,  it was announced that he would debut against his old club Lokomotiva. He came in the match as a 74th-minute substitute for Junior Fernandes as Dinamo won the match 2-0. Zoran Mamić, the coach of Dinamo Zagreb said: "Pavičić represents the future of Dinamo and maybe soon he will be in a very narrow choice for the first team." On 1 September 2017, Pavičić was loaned to Rijeka until January 2018. In January 2018, following the end of the loan, Pavičić signed a -year contract with Rijeka. After leaving Rijeka in summer 2022, he joined Konyaspor as a free agent, being followed by his teammate Robert Murić.

Career statistics

Honours
Dinamo Zagreb
Croatian First Football League winner (3): 2013–14, 2014–15, 2015–16
Croatian First Football League runner-up (1): 2016–17
Croatian Football Cup winner (2): 2015, 2016
Croatian Football Cup runner-up (2): 2014, 2017

Rijeka
Croatian First Football League runner-up (2): 2017–18, 2018–19
Croatian Football Cup winner (2): 2019, 2020
Croatian Football Cup runner-up (1): 2022

Individual
Most assists in the Croatian First Football League (1): 2017–18

References

External links

1994 births
Living people
Footballers from Zagreb
Croatian footballers
Croatia youth international footballers
Croatia under-21 international footballers
Association football midfielders
GNK Dinamo Zagreb players
NK Lokomotiva Zagreb players
HNK Rijeka players
Konyaspor footballers
Croatian Football League players
Süper Lig players
Croatian expatriate footballers
Croatian expatriate sportspeople in Turkey
Expatriate footballers in Turkey